HMNZS Rotoiti has been the name of three ships of the Royal New Zealand Navy:
, was a  patrol vessel, 1975–1991, pennant number P3569
, was a  inshore patrol boat, launched in 2007, pennant number P3569

Royal New Zealand Navy ship names